On 18 December 2016, a new Cabinet was formed under Prime Minister Saad Hariri. There were 30 ministers in this cabinet.

Composition

References

2016 establishments in Lebanon
Cabinets established in 2016
Cabinets of Lebanon
Michel Aoun